Mallerstang is a civil parish in the Eden District, Cumbria, England. It contains eight listed buildings that are recorded in the National Heritage List for England. Of these, one is listed at Grade I, the highest of the three grades, and the others are at Grade II, the lowest grade.  The parish is mainly rural; it contains the village of Outhgill and the surrounding countryside and moorland.  The listed buildings comprise a ruined tower house, a church, a group of three farmhouses with farm buildings, a house and its forecourt wall, and a bridge.


Key

Buildings

References

Citations

Sources

Lists of listed buildings in Cumbria
Listed